Livius Salinator  may refer to:
 Marcus Livius Salinator (254 BC-ca. 204 BC), Roman consul who fought in both the First Punic wars and Second Punic wars
 Gaius Livius Salinator, son of the above, Roman consul, said to have founded the city of Forum Livii